Curse: The Eye of Isis is a survival horror video game that was developed by British studio Asylum Entertainment and published by DreamCatcher Interactive and Wanadoo for the Xbox, PlayStation 2 and Windows. It was released stateside for Windows in October 2003 and for Xbox in April 2004. The PlayStation 2 version was only released in Europe.

It shares the same sort of atmospheric setting, gameplay, fixed camera angles, and ammo preservation as the earlier Resident Evil games, as well as many other archetypal survival horror games in the genre, such as ObsCure and Silent Hill.

The Xbox version of the game was very briefly backwards compatible with the Xbox 360, but was removed from the list because of glitches on December 1, 2005. The game remains unplayable on that system.

Storyline
Strange things are happening at Great Britain's museum of natural history in 1890. A gang of ruthless thugs have broken into the establishment, the Eye of Isis (an Egyptian statue) has been stolen, and a mysterious fog has overtaken a number of areas of the museum, killing and transforming all it comes into contact with.

Playing as museum curator/archeologist Victoria Sutton and her childhood friend Darien Dane, the players will have to fight the various beings and entities created by this fog. The players will spend considerable time in the museum, take a steam train to the coast and travel the seas in a huge cargo ship before finally entering the pyramid tomb where they must find and destroy the source of this ancient evil.

Reception
The game received mixed reception upon release, with the Xbox port receiving generally higher reviews due to the fixing of many of the PC versions bugs.

TeamXbox gave a mixed review, calling it an "average" game but that "being a budget title, gamers will find that Curse is one of the more solid el cheapo titles, and worth the twenty bucks".

GameInformer Magazine gave a generally negative review, comparing the game to a "B-horror movie", and stated that "the menus are clunky, the map is useless, and combat is too easy", although the controls were noted as above average, especially compared to the Resident Evil series.

GameChronicles, however, gave a generally positive review, praising the story, music, graphics, atmosphere, and voice acting, although noting the short length, simplistic combat, and linear gameplay as its shortcomings, but that they don't "...take away from the chills and thrills that await anyone who decides to play..."

References

2003 video games
Action-adventure games
Asylum Entertainment games
DreamCatcher Interactive games
Fiction set in 1890
2000s horror video games
Isis
Museums in popular culture
PlayStation 2 games
Single-player video games
Video games developed in the United Kingdom
Video games featuring female protagonists
Video games set in London
Video games set in the 1890s
Windows games
Xbox games